Stormcrow is the second studio album by Finnish power metal supergroup Cain's Offering, released on 19 May 2015. It is their first album with keyboardist Jens Johansson (Stratovarius, ex-Yngwie Malmsteen) and bassist Jonas Kuhlberg. The first song to be made available was the title-track, streamed from 22 April on. Eight days later, the band streamed "The Best of Times".

Guitarist and main songwriter Jani Liimatainen said he was approached a few years before about the possibility of a second Cain's Offering album, but at that time he was unavailable. When the subject came into consideration again in 2014, he decided to give it a try since he had more time. Comparing it to the previous album, Gather the Faithful, he said:

Drummer Jani Hurula described it as "majestic and humongous" and also said the album songs "are more concentrated and have more meat around them, ... Just the way we like them. The production was also exactly what each of us wanted it to be this time around." The title of the album, according to him, fits the band "perfectly. ... The underdogs are back with a vengeance!". Hurula also said the band is going to shoot a video for the album and they are also willing to tour, but he gave no further details. Liimatainen also expressed his wish to tour and shoot a video, but he depends on his bandmates schedules.

Track listing
All songs written by Jani Liimatainen except when noted

Credits
Cain's Offering
 Timo Kotipelto – lead vocals
 Jani Liimatainen – lead and rhythm guitars, acoustic guitar, backing vocals
 Jens Johansson – keyboards, piano
 Jonas Kuhlberg – bass
 Jani Hurula – drums

Additional musicians
 Petri Aho - backing vocals
 Antti Railio - backing vocals
 Perttu Vänskä - orchestral arrangements (on track 1, 5, 7 & 9)

References

2015 albums
Cain's Offering albums
Frontiers Records albums